The , is an archaeological site with the ruins of a Hakuhō period Buddhist temple and roof tile kiln remnants located in the Midorigaoka-cho and Nakano-cho neighborhoods of the city of Tondabayashi, Osaka, Japan. The temple and kilns no longer exists, but the loctations were collectively designated as a National Historic Site in 2002 together with the Okameishi Kofun.

Overview
The Shindō temple ruins are located on a river terrace formed by Ishikawa, a tributary of the Yamato River at the foot of the Habikino hill in the southern part of the Osaka Plain. It has been known since the early twentieth century as a ruined temple site, as old roof tiles were scattered on ground, but it was not excavated until 1959. At that time, the foundation of four buildings rebuilt during the Hakuhō period were confirmed, and the foundations of a pagoda to the south. The layout of structures was patterned after Shitennō-ji in Osaka, with the Middle Gate, Pagoda, Main Hall and Lecture Hall all lined up in a row from south-to-north, with the  cloiser connecting from the sides of the Middle Gate to the sides of the Lecture Hall, forming a courtyard which encloses the Pagoda and Main Hall. During the Tenpyō era (729-749), the temple was expanded, adding a South Gate, and additional East and West buildings connected to the cloister. The temple does not appear in historical documentation, so its true and history are unknown.

The Oganji-ike Tile Kiln Ruins is a semi-underground stepless climbing kiln located on the northeastern bank of Oganji Pond, about 500 meters northwest of the ruins of the Shindō Temple ruins.

The temple site is about a 20-minute walk from Tondabayashi Station on the Kintetsu Railway Kintetsu Nagano Line.

See also
List of Historic Sites of Japan (Osaka)

References

External links
Tondabayashi city home page 

Tondabayashi, Osaka
Kawachi Province
Asuka period
Historic Sites of Japan
Buddhist archaeological sites in Japan
Japanese pottery kiln sites